Norland can refer to any of the following:

People
Maurice Norland, a French athlete
Richard B. Norland, American diplomat

Places
Norland, Florida, USA
Norland, Ontario, Canada
Norland, Virginia, USA
Norland, West Yorkshire, England
Nordland, a county in north Norway
Norrland, the Northland of Sweden

Art, entertainment, and media
Norland (July 1914), a fictional European country in Arthur Conan Doyle's short story "Danger!"
Norlands (1936), a fictional Scandinavian country in John Buchan’s final Richard Hannay story “The Island of Sheep”.

Companies and institutions
Miami Norland High School, a high school in Miami Gardens, Florida
Norland College, a childcare training facility in Bath, United Kingdom
Norland Plastics, an auto parts supplier

Vessels
MV Norland, a ferry used as a troopship during the Falklands War

See also
The Norlands
Nordland (disambiguation)